Podocarpus polyspermus is a species of conifer in the family Podocarpaceae. It is found only in New Caledonia.

References

polyspermus
Vulnerable plants
Taxonomy articles created by Polbot
Taxa named by David John de Laubenfels